Douglas Alexander Mata is an American pathologist and epidemiologist currently at Foundation Medicine, Inc. in Cambridge, Massachusetts, known for his contributions to molecular pathological epidemiology and neuropsychiatric epidemiology. His textbook Statistics for Pathologists is a reference text in pathology medical education and his meta-analytical studies on physician mental health have circulated widely in the popular press.

References

Footnotes

Sources

Further reading

External links 
 
 
 

Rice University alumni
Baylor College of Medicine people
Harvard Medical School people
Year of birth missing (living people)
Living people